Daniel Vlas is a former Moldovan footballer who played as a defender.

Football career
On 3 October 2015, Daniel Vlas made his professional debut with Zimbru Chișinău in a 2015–16 Moldovan National Division match against Zaria Bălți.

References

External links

Daniel Vlas at Zimbru website

Notes

1995 births
Living people
Moldovan footballers
FC Zimbru Chișinău players
Association football defenders